Freddie Stewart (born Morris Joseph Lazar; March 25, 1925  – August 15, 2000) was an American actor and big band singer. He is best known for appearing in the Monogram Pictures film series The Teen Agers from 1946 to 1948.

Career
Stewart was born in New York City. He dropped out of  school to work as a stock clerk and also worked summers at a Catskills resort. He renamed himself Freddie Stewart (after actors James Stewart and Freddie Bartholomew) when he joined the Cappa Barra Harmonica Band in 1939. By the next year, he was working as a vocalist with Clyde McCoy's Orchestra for $60 a week. He worked his way up to his own radio show in New York on NBC, the fifteen-minute nightly, Freddie Stewart Sings.

He wrote a song called "Do I Know What I'm Doing" for She's for Me (1943), and made an appearance in She's a Sweetheart (1944). He later joined Tommy Dorsey's band as a singer for a year.

In 1945, he signed with Monogram Pictures to make a series of movies.

Select filmography
 Junior Prom (1946)
 Freddie Steps Out (1946)
 High School Hero (1946)
 Vacation Days (1947)
 Louisiana (1947)
Sarge Goes to College (1947)
Campus Sleuth (1948)
Smart Politics (1948)
Music Man (1948)

References

External links

1925 births
2000 deaths
20th-century American male actors
20th-century American singers
American crooners
American male film actors
Big band singers
Capitol Records artists
Singers from New York City
Swing singers
Traditional pop music singers
20th-century American male singers